is a Japanese slice of life manga series written and illustrated by Daisuke Igarashi. It was adapted into a two-part Japanese live action film released on August 30, 2014, and on February 14, 2015. Part 1 film "Little Forest: Summer/Autumn" was screened in the Culinary Zinema (Film and gastronomy) section at the 2014 San Sebastián International Film Festival, part 2 film "Little Forest: Winter/Spring" was screened in the Kulinarisches Kino (Culinary Cinema) section at the 2015 Berlin International Film Festival. It was also adapted into a Korean live action film which released on February 28, 2018, and into a South Korean TV series which premiered on August 12, 2019.

Plot
The manga is set in the Tōhoku region. It is about a young girl who returned to Tōhoku, her hometown, after a series of heartbreaking encounters that had happened to her life in the big city. She returned to her and her mother's old house, farming the land and living in accordance with the changing four seasons. Later, she received a letter from her mother and decided to try to "make it" in the city again before settling down and living as a farmer permanently in Tōhoku.

Characters
Ichiko (Ai Hashimoto)
Yūta (Takahiro Miura)
Kikko (Mayu Matsuoka)
Shigeyuki (Yōichi Nukumizu)
Sachiko (Karen Kirishima)

Japanese film production
Principal photography for the film lasted one year. Ōshū, Iwate was one of the places shot on location. The band Flower Flower, led by singer-songwriter Yui, wrote four theme songs for the films, one for each season.

Reception
The manga was one of the finalists at the 10th Tezuka Osamu Cultural Prize.

References

External links

Manga adapted into films
Seinen manga
Slice of life anime and manga
2010s Japanese films